WSCM (95.7 FM) is a radio station, broadcasting a classic country music format in Baldwin, Wisconsin. The station is currently owned by Civic Media.

History
Originally licensed to Durand, Wisconsin, the station went on the air as WRDN-FM on November 17, 1978. While licensed to Durand, the station operated on 95.9 FM. For much of its history, however, the station operated from studios in Menomonie, a larger city closer to the Eau Claire broadcast market.

The station changed its call sign to WYLT on January 1, 2002, to WJRV on January 17, 2002, and to WDMO on April 1, 2003.

The station formerly also had an AM sister in Durand, operating on 1430 AM with the call sign WQOQ. That station returned to the original WRDN call sign in 2011.

In 2008, Zoe Communications was granted a construction permit to move the station from Durand to Baldwin, which would also see its frequency changed to the current 95.7 FM. The station relaunched in Baldwin with its current branding and format on April 5, 2012. The AM sister station was sold to Durand Broadcasting, which relaunched it as a separate station with the call sign WRDN.

They also started local broadcasts of a weekly St. Croix Valley High School Football game on Friday nights and a midweek High School Boys/Girls Basketball game.

On December 1, 2022, the station changed its call sign to WSCM. On December 29, 2022, Civic Media closed on its purchase of WSCM from Zoe Communications.

On January 12, 2023, WSCM relaunched as "St. Croix Country".

References

External links

SCM
Classic country radio stations in the United States
Radio stations established in 1974
1974 establishments in Wisconsin